This is a List of Tamil Nadu first-class cricket records, with each list containing the top five performances in the category.

Currently active players are bolded.

Team records

Highest innings totals

Lowest innings totals

Largest margin of runs victory

Largest margin of runs victory

Batting records

Highest individual scores

Bowling records

Best innings bowling

Best match bowling

Hat-Trick

Notes

All lists are referenced to CricketArchive.

See also

 Tamil Nadu cricket team
 List of Tamil Nadu List A cricket records

Cricket in Tamil Nadu